Kerri Watt is a Scottish singer, songwriter and multi instrumentalist from Glasgow.

Early life 
Born and raised in a small town on the outskirts of Glasgow, Scotland, Watt's love of performing began at an early age. She competed in national dance competitions starting at age 7, taking home first place trophies every weekend. Watt dedicated every evening after school to dance and drama classes and focused her spare time on piano and classical voice lessons. Seeking out every opportunity to be in the spotlight, Watt landed lead roles in musicals at Kings Theatre Glasgow and parts as an extra in Scottish television shows River City, FBi and as a young dancer for the Disney Channel Kids Awards.

At age 16, Watt moved to Orange County, California after receiving a place at a performing arts high school. After a year studying in the States, she moved to London to train at Laine Theatre Arts. Watt played understudy Cinderella opposite Steve Guttenberg in a 2-month run at the Churchill Theatre Bromley in 2008/09 and toured the UK in Bill Kenwrights production of Jekyll and Hyde alongside Marti Pellow in 2011 before moving on from theatre to pursue a career in music.

2015 - 2019 
Watt is best known for her single "Long Way Home", which was playlisted on BBC Radio 2 on their A List. She performed the song on national TV on ITV's The Weekend with Aled Jones on 27 June 2015.

Also in 2015, Watt released a remix of her song "You"  produced by Oliver Nelson. The remix gained over 1.5 million plays online and hit the Number 1 spot on Hype Machine. In March 2016, Watt had more success with her follow-up single "The Wild" which was also added to the BBC Radio 2 B Playlist where it stayed for a month. While promoting the single, she toured the UK visiting over 20 radio stations and made a live appearance on STV's Live at Five in Glasgow on 22 March 2016.

In 2015/2016 Watt toured the UK and Europe supporting acts such as Mike and the Mechanics, Ward Thomas, Nina Nesbitt, The Overtones and Starsailor, and played festivals including Isle of Wight, Glastonbury, Secret Garden Party and Boardmasters.

On 11 and 12 July 2017 Watt joined Embrace (English band) on stage at the Millennium Stadium to open for Coldplay on their "A Head Full Of Dreams Tour."  Watt's collaboration with Embrace, "Never" was released as the lead single from Embrace's album the following year and was added to the BBC Radio 2 C list.

In May 2017, Watt announced her next single, "Old School Love", would be released on 7 July through East West Records, a part of Warner Music Group.

In 2018, Watt took a step back from releasing music to write and record material in Austin, Texas with Metal producer 'Machine' (Lamb of God/Clutch). Watt spent the remainder of 2018 road testing her new music around the UK at various festivals including C2C and Country Music Week and supported artists on tour including David Ramirez, Curse of Lono and Tom Speight.

For six months in 2018 while writing her debut album, Watt presented "The Americana Show with Kerri Watt" for 2 hours every Wednesday on Scottish radio station Pulse 98.4 FM. As host, Watt interviewed artists including Reef, Chance McCoy of Old Crow Medicine Show and Jon Allen while also playing music from the Americana scene. 

At the start of 2019, Watt signed an album deal and a publishing deal with record label Cooking Vinyl. On 1 July Watt announced her first single with Cooking Vinyl, "Cut Me Loose", would be released on 12 July. The song was featured on the BBC's televised footage of the Wimbledon Men's Final and made several appearances in episodes of British soap Eastenders. The song was also featured in the Call of Duty Mobile game for the Christmas season 2020. Her next single was "Chasing Aeroplanes", released on 1 November and premiered by Bob Harris on his Radio 2 Country Show. 2019 saw Watt support a number of artists including Keith Urban in London (where she additionally joined him on stage to sing Carrie Underwood's vocal parts from his 2016 hit single "The Fighter"), as special guest to Julio Iglesias at The Royal Albert Hall, to Rick Astley at Kew The Music and to Joe Jackson at The Palladium. Watt performed a mix of solo and full band shows at Glastonbury Festival, C2C, British Summer Time (with Celine Dion) and Cambridge Folk Festival, and as the special guest performer at BBC Radio Scotland's inaugural Singer-Songwriter Awards 2019.

2020 - 2022 

The beginning of 2020 saw Watt continuing with live shows throughout the UK. In January she performed at Celtic Connections in her home town of Glasgow and as a headliner at the AMAUK Showcase in London before going on to perform over 30 live streams throughout the Spring. Also in January, Watt performed a special acoustic version of "Psychotic Girl" by The Black Keys for The Mahogany Sessions - Covers. 

Watt released her third single with Cooking Vinyl "Kissing Fools" on 14 February, to coincide with Valentine's Day along with a fun cinematic video inspired by her love of 1990s movies. The video features Cody Molko (School of Rock, West End), son of Brian Molko, the lead singer of Placebo. In March 2020, Watt was invited to the home studio of Bob Harris to record an acoustic version of the song for Under The Apple Tree Sessions. In April 2020, Watt released an acoustic version of her 2019 single "Cut Me Loose" featuring London singer songwriter, Samuel Jack.

On 20 July 2020 Watt announced she would be releasing a series of three EP's called 'Chapters' with Cooking Vinyl each focusing on a different style of music that influences her songwriting. Each of the three EPs included a song from her upcoming album plus some stripped back originals and covers. Accompanying the EPs were three home made music videos Kerri filmed and edited herself during the Covid-19 lockdown period.

In 2021, Watt released her debut album "Neptune's Daughter" with Cooking Vinyl. The record debuted at number 11 on the Official UK Americana Charts and was described by Lisa Verrico in The Sunday Times as "an eclectic mix of spooky and sweet...a Quentin Tarantino-style soundtrack". The lead single from the album "Band of Gold" was championed by Bob Harris at BBC Radio 2 and Ricky Ross at BBC Radio Scotland. "Band of Gold" was added to Apple Music's "New Music Daily" Playlist in 14 countries. The single had an accompanying music video that featured footage from her time recording the album in Texas and shooting the artwork in California. Later in 2021, when live shows returned, Watt was special guest to Marti Pellow at his two sold out Scottish shows at The Glasgow Concert Hall and The Alhambra Theatre.

In November 2021, Watt released "Feeling Alright" - written with her brother Fraser Watt and two songwriter friends Jeff Cohen & Jenn Bostic under the group name "Big Kids". The song was used by Samsung for a tv commercial in their 2021/2022 global holiday campaign. The advert played in countries around the world, on the screens in Piccadilly Circus London, during the commercial break on the Christmas Day NFL game and amassed tens of millions of youtube views. As well as composing the song, Watt and her brother lent their vocals to the advert. 

In the Spring of 2022, Watt released a collaboration with British blues artist Mississippi MacDonald called "Devils Chain". In October 2022, Watt was special guest to Samuel Jack on his UK tour in Glasgow at King Tuts Wah Wah Hut.

References

External links
Official website

21st-century Scottish women singers
Scottish singer-songwriters
Musicians from Glasgow
Year of birth missing (living people)
Living people